Favreau Pillar is a pillar rock lying close east of Foyn Island in the Possession Islands, off the coast of Antarctica. It was mapped by the United States Geological Survey from surveys and U.S. Navy air photos, 1958–63, and was named by the Advisory Committee on Antarctic Names for Robert D. Favreau, United States Marine Corps, Navigator on the U.S. Navy Squadron VX-6 flight of January 18, 1958, at the time this feature was photographed.

References 

Rock formations of Victoria Land
Borchgrevink Coast